Damian Higgins (born 1972) better known by his stage name Dieselboy, is an American drum and bass DJ and music producer.

Early life
Dieselboy was born Damian Higgins in Tarpon Springs, Florida in 1972. At the age of six he moved to Colorado City, Colorado, where he and his two sisters were raised by their mother. He moved with his family to Oil City, Pennsylvania, on the third day of school in the 9th grade, and is a graduate of Oil City Senior High School. He is the eldest son of singer/songwriter Bertie Higgins whose ballad Key Largo reached #8 on Billboard's Hot 100 chart in 1982.

Higgins's early musical experience included playing drums in a school marching band and DJing for high school dances. "I originally started DJing (before learning to beatmatch) back in 1989 and 1990 at dances at Oil City Senior High School and also a small nightclub in Franklin, Pennsylvania, called Shenanigans. I DJ'ed three of my high school's dances, but I was just playing tunes, not mixing."

Higgins attended the University of Pittsburgh from 1990 to 1995 where he gained additional DJing experience, and completed a degree in information science. He also played on a Carnegie Mellon University radio station (WRCT). The name Dieselboy originated from Higgins's IRC handle, "Diesel". Upon discovering a local graffiti artist shared the alias, he "made it Dieselboy."

Career

Early career 
In 1994, Higgins created a mixtape entitled "The Future Sound of Hardcore," and sold about 100 copies through online LISTSERVs. "Through [the mixtape], people heard about me and I started getting bookings on the East Coast. It was a very slow process that eventually snowballed into my getting flown various places." In 1996, at the request of Dan Donnelly of British Drum and bass label Suburban Base, Dieselboy did a mix called "DrumAndBass Selection USA". In 1997, Suburban Base had him follow up with 97 Octane, this time allowing him to submit track suggestions, resulting in a more varied selection. In 1998, his mix called 611 DJ Mix-series Vol. One was released. Dieselboy did the graphics for the cover. Also that year, Dieselboy recorded a mix called Director’s Cut which he had packaged in film cans, his first experiment in presenting a dance mix in a quasi-cinematic framework.

In 1998, Dieselboy initiated Philadelphia's first 21+ drum 'n' bass weekly Thursday club night entitled "Platinum" at club Fluid, which ended on October 14, 2004. Platinum residents included Dieselboy, Kaos, Method One, Sine, Icon, Karl K, Mason, and MC's Dub2, Messinian, Armanni Reign, Sharpness, and Illy Emcee. It was rekindled in late 2009 featuring Mason, Sine and MC's Messinian & Sharpness.

In 1999, Dieselboy released his fourth mix CD, "A Soldier's Story" on the Moonshine label. It opened with his first original “intro” and marked his CD debut as a producer with Atlantic State, a track co-produced with Technical Itch. Also released on the Moonshine label was System Upgrade (2000) while Dieselboy joined forces with Palm Pictures/Island Recordings and his releases The Descent, Invid, Render. The 6ixth Session was a double CD release on Palm Pictures, featuring a cyborg-themed mix described by the Washington Post as “hard-edged hyperdriven dance music".

Dieselboy performed at Industry nightclub in Rochester, NY on August 9, 2001.

Human Imprint 
In 2001, Dieselboy founded Human Imprint, the drum 'n' bass imprint of electronic dance music label System Recordings. For projectHUMAN (2002), Dieselboy presented a mix framed as a movie trailer that reached #6 on the Billboard Dance/Electronic album chart. In 2003, Dieselboy was invited by DJ Magazine to create a mix showcasing American d&b entitled DJ World Series: D & B From The United States, on which he featured American producers Hive, Echo, Mason, Juju, Kaos, Karl K, Jae Kennedy, Stratus and Sinthetix.

For his 2004 DJ mix called The Dungeonmaster's Guide, Dieselboy asked Peter Cullen to be the voice of the Dungeonmaster who narrates the mix.

In 2006, Dieselboy released his first Human Imprint compilation called "The HUMAN Resource". Disc One Selected Works, is a 12-song un-mixed selection. Disc Two Evol Intent Assemble the Monster features a continuous DJ-mix from Evol Intent.

In May 2008, Dieselboy released his ninth major mix-CD Substance D (Human Imprint), which reached the Billboard Dance/Electronic album chart. In conjunction with this release, Dieselboy initiated the "Monsters of Jungle" tour with rotating Human Imprint label artists including Evol Intent, Ewun, Demo, Mayhem, SPKTRM, Infiltrata and MC Messinian.

SubHuman Imprint 
In July 2009, Human Imprint parted amicably from System Recordings. In summer 2010, Human relaunched with Steve Gordon of Steez Promo and Circle Management as new co-owner with Dieselboy, and they created the SubHuman Imprint for dubstep and electro releases.

On New Year's Eve 2009 headlining a 3D Productions event at Club 24 in Washington, D.C., Dieselboy played a three-hour multi-subgenre set including drum and bass, dubstep and electro. The enthusiastic crowd response encouraged him to continue experimenting with this new open format into 2010. In January 2013 Dieselboy started playing all drum and bass sets again.

On January 31, 2011, Dieselboy released his first new mix in two and a half years, "Dieselboy – Unleashed!", as a free download on SoundCloud. He also performed with Skrillex. In 2012 he released the mix "Wake The Dead" on SoundCloud. On May 23, 2013, Dieselboy's mix "Beyond the Black Bassline" was released by Skrillex's then new NEST HQ website.

Dieselboy released his 93-track, 87-minute mix "Dieselboy – The Destroyer" on August 5, 2014. The mix and its art incorporate the aesthetics of his 2014 tour as Blood, Sweat and Bass with bass music producer Downlink and 1970s grindhouse films. It includes a new collaboration with drum and bass producer Gridlok called "MDMX," and three tracks by Faces of Def, a new collaborative project between Dieselboy and Mark the Beast ["Blvck Celebration" with Counterstrike (SubHuman); "Carcosa" with Mayhem and Downlink (SubHuman); remix of "Tuh Tuh Duh" by Sinister Souls (PRSPCT)].

Culinary career 
In 2014, Dieselboy's passion for food advanced beyond writing about it for the James Beard Award-winning FirstWeFeast.com blog, into professional kitchens. He cooked a sold-out collaboration dinner with respected chefs Matt McCallister and Alex Stupak at FT33 restaurant in Dallas on June 9, 2014. Dieselboy competed in a nacho battle against chef Alex Stupak at Empellón Cocina in New York in February 2013, which he lost. He came back to face off against chefs Alex Stupak, Michael Anthony, Wylie Dufresne and Seamus Mullen in February 2014, beating Mullen.

Dieselboy assisted chefs Dave Beran (Chicago), Daniel Patterson (San Francisco), and Christina Tosi (New York City) at an Art Basel dinner hosted by Questlove in Miami on December 6, 2014.

In November 2014, Dieselboy's cooking was featured at his first "pop-up" event called "Burger Night with Dieselboy" at the Groningen, Netherlands restaurant De Boom, preceding his DJ performance at Subsonic nightclub. In January 2015, another pop-up hamburger event took place at P60 cafe in Amstelveen, Netherlands as a prelude to his DJ gig at the P60 club.

In 2012, Dieselboy was a co-presenter with mixologist Jim Meehan (PDT, New York City) and chef/designer Taavo Somer at the Origins and Frontiers mixology workshop at the 7th Annual StarChefs.com International Chefs Congress in New York City. Dieselboy's cocktail "The Higgins" is published in The New York Times cocktail writer Robert Simonson's 2014 book The Old-Fashioned (Ten Speed Press).

Dieselboy collaborated with Betony restaurant chef Bryce Shuman on a limited edition hot dog as part of a monthlong "musicians and chefs" special menu at the New York City cocktail lounge PDT in May 2015. On August 9, 2015 as part of the Moonrise Festival in Baltimore, Maryland, Dieselboy and The Glitch Mob hosted a Taco Party for contest winners.

Awards and recognition
Dieselboy placed #23 in the 2014 America's Best DJ Poll, up 19 from the previous year's #42, between Moby and BT. Dieselboy was the highest ranked drum & bass DJ (#45) in the 2008 DJ Times America's Best DJ Poll.

On February 12, 2012 in accepting his Grammy for Best Remixed Recording, Non-Classical, Skrillex (Sonny Moore) ended his comments quoting Dieselboy as saying "All the boats rise with the water."

In 1998, Dieselboy was the first American drum & bass DJ to be nominated for Best Drum & Bass DJ at the Global DJ Mix Awards, tying with LTJ Bukem.

Discography

Mix compilations

{{hidden
|headerstyle = background: #ccccff;
|style = border:1px solid grey;
|header=The 6ixth Session (2xCD) – Palm Pictures (2000)
|content=
Disc One (mixed by Dieselboy)
01. "Initialize" – Dieselboy vs. Atlantiq
02. "The Messiah" – Kemal & Rob Data
03. "Heavy Metal" – Technical Itch
04. "Nanobugs" – Signal to Noise
05. "Bios Fear" – Underfire vs. Negative
06. "Homicide" – Future Cut & Futurebound
07. "Shrapnel (Stakka & Skynet Remix)" – Usual Suspects
08. "Firewire" – Andy C & Shimon
09. "Toxin" – )EIB(
10. "Invid (E-Sassin VIP)" – Dieselboy
11. "The Descent (Phunckateck VIP) – Dieselboy
12. "Pusher" – Technical Itch
13. "Eclipse" – Loxy & Dylan
14. "Plimsoul VIP" – Facs & C-Key
15. "Space Age Remix" – Teebee
16. "Dominion" – Dylan
17. "Solarize" – J Majik
Disc Two
Dieselboy – Invid
Dieselboy – Render
Dieselboy – The Descent
Dieselboy – Invid (E-Sassin VIP)
Dieselboy – The Descent (Phunckateck Communications VIP)
}}

Singles
 Patriot Games EP (2x12") – Tech Itch Recordings
 The Descent (12") – Palm Pictures (1999)
 The Trans-Atlantic Link Part 1 (12") – Tech Itch Recordings
 Invid (12") – Palm Pictures (2000)
 Render (12") – Palm Pictures (2000)
 Invid (Remixes) (2x12") – Palm Pictures (2002)
 Barrier Break/Submission (2X12") – (Dieselboy & Kaos) Human Imprint (11/17/03)
 N/V/D (12") – Dieselboy (Counterstrike Zentraedi remix) Human Imprint (5/8/08)
 Midnight Express (12") – Dieselboy + Evol Intent + Ewun, Human Imprint (5/15/08)
 Get Back (CD) – Blokhe4d & Dieselboy, Unique Artists (2010)
 W.M.F.D. (Digital) – Dieselboy & Bare, Human Imprint (HUMA 8035, 6/20/2012)
 MDMX (Digital) – Gridlok feat. Dieselboy, Project 51 (P5130, 8/25/2014)

Remixes
 Hard Times – Baby Namboos (Dieselboy + Decoder) Palm Pictures (2000)
 Opticon – Orgy (Dieselboy + Technical Itch Arena mix) Reprise (2001)
 Subculture – Styles of Beyond (Dieselboy + Kaos VIP) Human Imprint (2002)
 You Must Follow – Stratus (Dieselboy + Kaos) Human Imprint (2003)
 Grunge 3 – Bad Company UK (Dieselboy, Kaos + Karl K) Human Imprint (2003)
 Moulin Rouge – Dom + Roland (Dieselboy, Kaos + Karl K) Human Imprint (2005)
 Hooked – Dom + Gridlok (Tech Itch + Dieselboy) Project 51 (P51UK10, 8.7.2006)
 Tuh Tuh Duh – Sinister Souls (feat. Dieselboy feat. Mark the Beast) PRSPCT (PRSPCTRMXEP001,1.28.2015)

Videogames
 Amplitude : Styles of Beyond – Subculture (Dieselboy & Kaos Rock Remix)
 Crackdown : Dieselboy & Kaos – Barrier Break Gran Turismo 4 : Dieselboy & Kaos & Karl K (feat. Messinian) – Nitro Need for Speed: Most Wanted : Dieselboy & Kaos – Barrier Break Saints Row : Styles of Beyond – Subculture (Dieselboy & Kaos Remix)

Compilation appearances
 Opticon – Orgy (Dieselboy + Technical Itch Arena Mix) (2001) on Orgy: Opticon Remixes (12") – Reprise Records
 Opticon – Orgy (Dieselboy + Technical Itch Arena Dub Mix) (2001) on Orgy: Opticon Remixes (12") – Reprise Records
 Grunge 3 – Bad Company UK (Dieselboy, Kaos + Karl K) HUMAN (2003) on Andy C: Nightlife (CD) – Ram Records (2003)
 Get Back – Blokhe4d + Dieselboy on Unique Artists: Volume 1 – Unique Artists (UA001CD, 8/23/2010)

Filmography
 Put the Needle on the Record (2004)
 American Massive (2002)
 Atlantic State (Technical Itch + Dieselboy), Sounds & Motion: V. 01 (Ukraine, 2002)
 Moonshine Over America'' (2000)

See also
 Human Imprint
 SubHuman : Human Imprint

References

External links

 Official Dieselboy Website
 DnBTV interview on February 27, 2006 Louisville
 Dieselboy page, Planet Human Label Website
 Dieselboy on Soundcloud
 Dieselboy bio at TheDJList.com
 Dieselboy bio at ResidentAdvisor.net
 Dieselboy at rolldabeats
 
 Archived Pit5.com discography

American drum and bass musicians
American DJs
Food writers
Musicians from New York City
Musicians from Pittsburgh
People from Tarpon Springs, Florida
Remixers
1972 births
Living people
Electronic dance music DJs